Anastasia Linnik (born 11 July 1993) is a Belarusian football who plays as a midfielder for Premier League club Dinamo-BGU and the Belarus women's national team.

Honours 
Zorka-BDU
Winner
 Belarusian Women's Cup (2): 2010, 2012
 Belarusian Women's Super Cup (2): 2010, 2013

Runner-up
 Belarusian Premier League: 2014
 Belarusian Women's Cup: 2014
 Belarusian Women's Super Cup: 2015

External links 
 
 Profile at uefa.com

1993 births
Living people
Women's association football midfielders
Belarusian women's footballers
Footballers from Minsk
Belarus women's international footballers
FC Dinamo Minsk players
Belarusian women's futsal players